Swantham Enna Padam is a 1980 Indian Malayalam film, directed by Sreekumaran Thampi and produced by P. K. Kaimal. The film stars Madhu, Srividya, Sukumari and Jose in the lead roles. The film has musical score by Shyam. Parts of the movie were shot on location in Kashmir, thereby becoming the first Malayalam movie to do so.

Cast
 
Madhu 
Srividya 
Sukumari 
Jose 
Sankaradi 
Ambika 
Kuthiravattam Pappu 
Master Rajakumaran Thampi
Meena 
Raveendran

Soundtrack
The music was composed by Shyam and the lyrics were written by Sreekumaran Thampi.

References

External links
  
 

1980 films
1980s Malayalam-language films
Films directed by Sreekumaran Thampi